The rivalry between AFC Wimbledon and Milton Keynes Dons arose from the formation of both clubs due to the relocation of Wimbledon F.C. to Milton Keynes. For many years the two clubs played at different levels of English football, with the first competitive fixture between them taking place on 2 December 2012 - a second round FA Cup tie in which the two clubs were drawn against one another.

Following AFC Wimbledon's promotion to the Football League, and subsequent promotion to League One in 2016, fixtures between the two clubs have taken place regularly.

The rivalry was named as one of "5 of the fiercest rivalries in the Football League" and one of the "8 biggest derbies in the EFL" by commentators. A 2019 study ranked the rivalry 22nd out of the top 30 derbies in all of English football. The fixture has been labelled "one of football's biggest grudge games".

History

Origins

Wimbledon Football Club relocated to Milton Keynes in September 2003, 16 months after receiving permission to do so from the Football Association on the basis of a two-to-one decision in favour by an FA-appointed independent commission. Hugely controversial, the move's authorisation prompted disaffected Wimbledon supporters to form AFC Wimbledon, a new club, in June 2002. The relocated team played home matches in Milton Keynes under the Wimbledon name from September 2003 until June 2004, when following the end of the 2003–04 season they renamed themselves Milton Keynes Dons F.C. (MK Dons).

First encounter

On 14 November 2012, the two clubs were drawn to play against each other for the first time in a second round FA Cup tie which would take place on 2 December 2012. At the time, MK Dons were an established League One club, and AFC Wimbledon a League Two club having achieved promotion from the Conference National in 2011. MK Dons were drawn as the home team, with the fixture being played at the club's home ground of Stadium MK. The tie was accompanied by worldwide press attention and was selected for live coverage by television networks around the world as well as being chosen for broadcast by ITV domestically in the UK.

Wimbledon Independent Supporters Association, representing fans of AFC Wimbledon, initially considered encouraging their supporters to boycott the fixture, but later released a statement suggesting individual supporters made an "informed decision" as to whether they attended or not. AFC Wimbledon chief executive Erik Samuelson stated that following discussions with the club's owners, board members would refuse hospitality at Stadium MK on the day of the fixture.

A crowd of 16,459 including several thousand AFC Wimbledon supporters eventually attended the match. The first half saw little action, but on the stroke of half-time it was the home side that took the lead with a 25-yard strike from midfielder Stephen Gleeson. 

After the break, chances for both sides followed. On the 59th-minute, AFC Wimbledon equalised through striker Jack Midson's header, and almost took the lead themselves when Steven Gregory's shot produced a save from MK Dons' goalkeeper David Martin. The match ended in dramatic fashion when on the 93rd-minute, substitute Jon Otsemobor's flick with the back of his boot resulted in a last gasp 2–1 victory for Milton Keynes Dons. Supporters of the club later dubbed the unique goal, the "Heel of God".

Notable subsequent encounters
The first encounter between the two clubs to take place at AFC Wimbledon's (then) home ground of Kingsmeadow took place on 14 March 2017. The fixture was a League One match between the two that took place during the 2016–17 season as a result of AFC Wimbledon's promotion from League Two the previous season. This was the first season in which the two clubs would meet at the same level of the English football league system. The match was played in front of a heated atmosphere between both groups of fans. Following a stalemate in the first half, AFC Wimbledon midfielder Jake Reeves struck just after the hour mark before striker Lyle Taylor added a second soon after to seal the victory. The match ended 2–0 to the home side.

On 30 January 2021 the first fixture between the two clubs at AFC Wimbledon's new Plough Lane stadium took place, albeit without spectators in attendance due to the COVID-19 pandemic. Milton Keynes Dons emerged from the encounter as 2–0 winners.

Controversies
Due to the rivalry between the two clubs, there have been a number of controversies and incidents over the years, both on and off the pitch.

During the first fixture between the two clubs at Stadium MK on 2 December 2012, a small plane chartered by AFC Wimbledon supporters flew over the stadium several times flying a banner which read "We are Wimbledon". Following the fixture, a local newspaper reported that a small minority of visiting AFC Wimbledon supporters were allegedly responsible for damage caused to "seating, toilet and refreshment facilities" within the stadium.

There were security concerns ahead of the first fixture to take place between the two clubs at AFC Wimbledon's (then) home ground of Kingsmeadow on 14 March 2017. Due to the street layout surrounding the venue there were safety concerns that groups of opposing supports would clash. Only 650 tickets were allocated to visiting fans. Following consultation between the police and the two clubs it was agreed the match would be designated as a "bubble fixture" with visiting MK Dons supporters only allowed to travel to the match via mandatory coach travel arranged by the club. On arrival, visiting supporters were then escorted to the ground by police. A similar arrangement remained in place for every subsequent fixture between the two clubs at Kingsmeadow.

On 20 December 2017, AFC Wimbledon were charged by the EFL with an alleged breach of league regulations following their home encounter with Milton Keynes Dons on 22 September 2017. The alleged breach related to the club not referring to Milton Keynes Dons by their full name on Kingsmeadow's electronic scoreboard throughout the tie as well as failing include their name on the cover of the matchday programme.

In April 2018, the EFL reported that it was facilitating mediation between the two clubs in an attempt to reach an amicable agreement in relation to the clubs' relationship towards one another. On 10 July 2019, a further statement revealed mediation talks were still ongoing but that a temporary agreement for AFC Wimbledon to treat MK Dons' club name in an equal manner to any other visiting club, in relation to the matchday programme and scoreboard, had been reached.

Players for both clubs

No footballer has played for both clubs on a permanent basis. The following footballers have played for both clubs, although all have been loan signings for one or both clubs. 

AFC Wimbledon, then Milton Keynes Dons

 

Milton Keynes Dons, then AFC Wimbledon

Footballers who previously played for Wimbledon

The following players played for the original Wimbledon club, and later played for either AFC Wimbledon or Milton Keynes Dons. The majority of players who have played for both Wimbledon FC and Milton Keynes Dons were members of the team at the time of the relocation.

Wimbledon and AFC Wimbledon

Wimbledon and Milton Keynes Dons

Statistics
All figures are correct as of 9 April 2022.

Head-to-head results

Records
First competitive meeting: Milton Keynes Dons 2–1 AFC Wimbledon – FA Cup second round, 2 December 2012
First EFL Cup/League Cup meeting: Milton Keynes Dons 3–1 AFC Wimbledon – First round, 12 August 2014
First EFL Trophy/League Trophy meeting: Milton Keynes Dons 2–3 AFC Wimbledon – Second round, 7 October 2014
First FA Cup meeting: Milton Keynes Dons 2–1 AFC Wimbledon – Second round, 2 December 2012
First league meeting: Milton Keynes Dons 1–0 AFC Wimbledon – League One, 10 December 2016
First away victory:
AFC Wimbledon: Milton Keynes Dons 2–3 AFC Wimbledon – League Trophy second round, 7 October 2014
Milton Keynes Dons: AFC Wimbledon 0–2 Milton Keynes Dons – League One, 22 September 2017
Highest scoring game: Milton Keynes Dons 2–3 AFC Wimbledon – League Trophy second round, 7 October 2014
Largest winning margin:
AFC Wimbledon: 2–0 – League One, 14 March 2017
Milton Keynes Dons: 3–1 – League Cup first round, 12 August 2014
Most consecutive wins:
AFC Wimbledon: 1
Milton Keynes Dons: 2 
Longest undefeated run:
AFC Wimbledon: 1 (7 October 2014 – 10 December 2016; 1 win and 14 March 2017 – 22 September 2017; 1 win)
Milton Keynes Dons: 7 (22 September 2017 – Present; 5 wins and 3 draws)
Most consecutive draws: 1
Most meetings in a season: 2 – 6 seasons
Most goals: 2 – Benik Afobe (Milton Keynes Dons), Matt O'Riley (Milton Keynes Dons) and Daniel Powell (Milton Keynes Dons)
Most appearances: 10 – Dean Lewington (Milton Keynes Dons)
Highest league attendance: 16,459 at Stadium MK, FA Cup second round, 2 December 2012

See also
Major football rivalries
South London derby
List of sports rivalries in the United Kingdom

References

External links

Milton Keynes Dons F.C.

AFC Wimbledon
England football derbies